Schule Schloss Salem (Anglicisation: School of Salem Castle, Salem Castle School) is a boarding school with campuses in Salem and Überlingen in Baden-Württemberg, Southern Germany.

It offers the German Abitur, as well as the International Baccalaureate (IB). With a scholarship program and its "Dienste" (Services) such as the Firebrigade, the "Technisches Hilfswerk" short: THW (Technical Support Organisation), the First Aid or the Nautical Service. The Schule Schloss Salem, also commonly referred to as Salem College, hence offers an education for its students at the academic as well as social levels.

The school was established by the educator Kurt Hahn with the support of Prince Maximilian of Baden in 1920 and, from the beginning, it accepted both girls and boys. Under the Nazi regime, Hahn (who was Jewish) was forced to emigrate to Scotland, where he founded the British Salem School of Gordonstoun and subsequently the Outward Bound organisation and the United World Colleges.

The school today

The academic program in Years 5–7 is in German. Intensive instruction in German as a foreign language is available for international pupils.

From Year 8 onward, Salem is fully bilingual and offers a dual curriculum. Students may either continue in the German system (Abitur) or enter the international classes & the IB Diploma Programme, in which the language is English. However, students may switch systems until they enter the upper school. Approximately a third of the students in the upper years are in the IB system. Most students are of German background, but there are a significant number of international students, with students attending from a variety of countries such as Switzerland, Spain, USA, China, Russia, Korea, India, Canada, Australia or Italy.

At Salem, involvement in extracurricular activities and the life in the boarding community and academic achievement are equally emphasized. All students in the upper years must engage in community service such as Nautical Service, THW (Technical Support Organisation) extended First Aid, Community Service (Kindergarten, Disabled people's home, etc.) or Fire brigade at least one afternoon per week. During the 2002 Überlingen mid-air collision, Salem Students were some of the first at the scene. All students must also participate in a regular program of sports and/or outdoor pursuits such as Outward Bound, Football, Rugby or Gymnastics. Participation in theatre, music and visual-arts extracurricular programs, while not mandatory, is strongly encouraged. The student orchestra in Salem is regarded to be one of the foremost youth-orchestras in Germany and travels around the world to perform its music, such as a recent trip to Beijing, China.

Far more than in boarding schools from the Anglo-American tradition, responsibility for the everyday running of the School in the upper years is, in keeping with Salem's democratic ethos based on the principles of Kurt Hahn, placed in the hands of students under the guidance of staff. All activities and dormitories (Flügel) are led by students elected by their peers. School regulations are outlined with the consent of the student parliament and breaches of these are jointly dealt with by the School administration and the elected leaders of the student body in what is called the Leitungsrat or the 'Leadership Council', which comprises the headmaster of the college, the two Head Boys/Girls, the students housemaster/mistress and other senior staff members.

In 2013 the one-year interdisciplinary Salem Kolleg was opened in Überlingen. The autonomously operated Studium generale programme prepares high school graduates for their academic and professional future through an orientation year of three trimesters during which trained advisors provide intensive career counseling, personal assessment with the help of assessment tests such as the Holland Codes, and outdoor leadership courses. The programme shares many of the facilities of Salem International College on the Härlen campus in Überlingen. The founding director was Gerhard Teufel, former director of the German Academic Scholarship Foundation (Studienstiftung des deutschen Volkes).

Beginning with school year 2018/2019 Salem introduced a programme titled 10 Plus, which allows students from other academic tracks to achieve a full-accredited Abitur after one supplemental year of high school before entering the so-called Kollegstufe (Years 11 and 12), the equivalent of the British Sixth form.

Approximately one-third of pupils receive financial aid through various scholarship programmes, the distribution of which is based upon both need and merit.

Campuses 
Salem is spread among three separate campuses: the Lower School (grades 5 to 7) and the Middle School in Salem Castle (grades 8 to 11, and Pre-IB), and the 'Upper' (secondary) School in Spetzgart Castle and the new campus of Härlen (Grades 11 and 12, IB years 1 and 2). The Lower School was located in ′′Schloss Hohenfels′′, an isolated castle above the town of Kalkofen 20 kilometers to the west of Salem, until the end of school year 2016/17. Salem Castle is located in a former Cistercian monastery, which prior to secularisation in 1802–1803 was known as Salem Abbey, in the town of Salem. The Upper School is located along the shores of Lake Constance on the outskirts of Überlingen in Spetzgart Castle (since 1928) and on the modern Härlen campus, which was opened in September 2000.

School heads 

 Stefan Steinebach, Head of Lower and Middle School
 Ken Lander, Head of Upper School

Notable alumni
 Cleo von Adelsheim (born 1987), actress and hereditary princess of Oettingen-Spielberg
 Prince Philip, Duke of Edinburgh (1921–2021) (He later attended the British Salem School at Gordonstoun, as did his sons)
 Queen Sofía of Spain
 Princess Irene of Greece and Denmark, daughter of king Paul I of Greece and princess Frederica of Hanover
 Begum Inaara Aga Khan (as Gabriele Thyssen)
 Berthold Maria Schenk Graf von Stauffenberg (born 1934), major general and eldest son of count Claus von Stauffenberg
 Alice Ricciardi-von Platen (1910–2008), psychoanalyst and author of the world's first documentary about the mass killings of disabled and mentally ill persons by the Nazi regime
 Golo Mann (1909–1994), writer and son of Thomas Mann
 Monika Mann (1910–1992), writer and daughter of Thomas Mann
 George Mosse (1918–1999), historian and grandson of Rudolf Mosse
 Elisabeth Noelle-Neumann (1916–2010), German political scientist (though she earned her Abitur in Göttingen)
 Ferdinand, Prince of Bismarck (1930–2019), head of the princely house of Bismarck
 Brian Simon (1915–2002), educational historian
 Patrice Bart-Williams (born 1979), reggae singer
 Ekkehard von Kuenssberg CBE (1913–2001), Former President of the Royal College of General Practitioners, Edinburgh, Scotland
 Christian Kracht (born 1966), Swiss writer
 Hans-Ulrich von Oertzen (1915–1944), Major in the General Staff, member of the Wehrmacht conspiracy to overthrow Adolf Hitler and participant in the unsuccessful July 20 plot in 1944
 Rudolf August Oetker (1916–2007), grandson of the inventor of baking powder, and billionaire German entrepreneur.
 Eric "Winkle" Brown (1919–2016), test pilot who attended the college as an exchange student 1938–39
Wolfgang Kiessling (born 1937), entrepreneur who is the founder of Loro Parque and Siam Park in Tenerife.

References

External links
 Schule Schloss Salem website
 Schule Schloss Salem Official Twitter Page
 Round Square Website
 International Baccalaureate Organization Website

 
Round Square schools
International Baccalaureate schools in Germany
Private schools in Germany
Gymnasiums in Germany
Boarding schools in Germany
Educational institutions established in 1920
Co-educational boarding schools
1920 establishments in Germany